Fahd bin Muqrin Al Saud (Arabic:فهد بن مقرن) is a Saudi businessperson, and member of the House of Saud.

Biography
He is the president of the Saudi national initiative "Sons of the Homeland," an initiative "led by 50 intellectuals, scientists and business leaders in the Kingdom" whose purpose is "to prepare youth to serve the nation and contribute toward the homeland's security. He is also the president of the Saudi National Environmental Education Initiative. Fahd is the son of former Crown Prince Muqrin bin Abdul-Aziz and Noura bint Ahmed Almuqrin, and a brother of Prince Turki bin Muqrin bin Abdulaziz and Prince Mansour bin Muqrin.

His son, Faisal bin Fahd, has been deputy governor of Hail since 2018.

References

Fahd
Living people
Fahd
Year of birth missing (living people)